Severin Finne (12 March 1883 – 24 March 1953) was a Norwegian fencer. He competed in the individual and team épée events at the 1912 Summer Olympics.

References

External links
 

1883 births
1953 deaths
Norwegian male épée fencers
Olympic fencers of Norway
Fencers at the 1912 Summer Olympics
Sportspeople from Oslo